It was a Dacian fortified town.

References

Dacian fortresses in Iași County
Historic monuments in Iași County
History of Western Moldavia